The Little Room is a 2010 Swiss drama film directed by Stéphanie Chuat and Véronique Reymond. The film was selected as the Swiss entry for the Best Foreign Language Film at the 83rd Academy Awards but it didn't make the final shortlist.

Cast
 Florence Loiret Caille as Rose
 Michel Bouquet as Edmond
 Eric Caravaca as Marc
 Joël Delsaut as Jacques
 Valerie Bodson as Bettina
 Véronique Fauconnet as Lorna
 Marc Olinger as Bernard
 Claudine Pelletier as Edith
 Daniel Plier as Ophtalmologue
 Raoul Schlechter as Homme avec bébé

See also
 List of submissions to the 83rd Academy Awards for Best Foreign Language Film
 List of Swiss submissions for the Academy Award for Best Foreign Language Film

References

External links
 
 La petite chambre at the Locarno International Film Festival

2010 films
Swiss drama films
2010s French-language films
2010 drama films
French-language Swiss films